Kanave Kalayadhe  is a 1999 Indian Tamil-language romantic drama film directed by V Gowthaman. The film stars Murali and Simran. Simran played a dual role for the first time in her career. The score and soundtrack was composed by Deva. It was produced by Sivasakthi Movie Makers. The film opened on 6 August 1999 to mixed reviews from critics.

Plot 
Anand and Amritha are lovers living in Chandigarh. While Amrita is a Punjabi, Anand is a Tamilian. In order to seek the approval of Amrita's parents for their marriage, Anand goes to Amrita's home in Punjab. However, before they can unite, Amritha and her family die in a bomb blast. Unable to bear the separation, Anand goes into depression. His friends take him to Chennai with the hope that he will start life afresh. There, life throws a googly at him when he sees Saradha, Amrita's lookalike. After the initial hiccups, Anand and Saradha fall in love with each other and decide to get married. But at this point, Anand learns that Shekhar, Sharada's old lover, is still waiting for her. How is Anand going to handle this strange game of fate?

Cast 

Murali as Anand
Simran in a dual role as:
Amrita (Punjabi) (voiced by Savitha Reddy)
Saradha (Tamilian) (voiced by Sreeja Ravi)
Delhi Ganesh as Saradha's father
Chinni Jayanth as Pavadarayan
Charle as Paneer
Dhamu as Selvam
Shakti Kumar as Shekhar
Rajeev as Manager
Kovai Sarala as Kayal Vizhi
Ponnambalam as Fighter
Sabitha Anand as Manager's wife
Yograj Singh as Sardhaji
Ramji in a special appearance

Production
The film was shot in locations including the Golden Temple in Amritsar, Jallianwala Bagh, the rock gardens in Chandigarh, the Wagah border and Ananthpur Sahib. Shooting coincided with the celebrations of the 300th anniversary of the founding of the Khalsa Panth.

Soundtrack 

These 6 songs in Kanave Kalayadhe are composed by Deva and lyrics by Vaali, Vairamuthu and Ponniyin Selvan.

Reception
The Hindu wrote "SIVASAKTHI MOVIE Makers’, “Kanavae Kalayathae” is replete with emotional twists handled with taste and refinement by debutant director V. Gouthaman. The lead pair, Murali and Simran lend enough depth in their portrayals. The good pace the director works out in the first half through his screenplay". Kalki called it an "old fashioned love story" but praised the acting of Murali and Simran also praised Deva's music and Thangar Bachan's cinematography.

References

External links

1999 films
1990s Tamil-language films
Films scored by Deva (composer)
1999 directorial debut films
Indian romantic drama films
Films set in Punjab, Pakistan
Films set in Punjab, India
Films shot in Punjab, India
1999 romantic drama films